Intrepid Camera is a British manufacturer of large format cameras and darkroom equipment.

Their cameras are noted for being inexpensive and lightweight compared to large format cameras from other manufacturers.

History 
Intrepid was founded in 2014 in Brighton UK by University of Sussex product design student Maxim Grew through a successful Kickstarter campaign. Following the successful launch of a 4×5 format camera, the company has since expanded to produce cameras in 5×7 and 8×10 formats, as well as enlargers.

Products

Cameras 

 Intrepid 4×5
 MK4 (2019)
 Black Edition (2021)
 MK5 (2022)
 Intrepid 5×7 (2020)
 Intrepid 8×10
 MK2 (2019)
 MK3 (2022)

Enlargers 

 Intrepid 4×5 Enlarger
 Intrepid Compact Enlarger

References

External links 

 Official company website

Photography companies of England